The National Academy of Sciences of Ukraine (NASU; , Natsional’na akademiya nauk Ukrayiny, abbr: NAN Ukraine) is a self-governing state-funded organization in Ukraine that is the main center of development of science and technology by coordinating a system of research institutes in the country. It is the main research oriented organization along with the five other academies in Ukraine specialized in various scientific disciplines. NAS Ukraine consists of numerous departments, sections, research institutes, scientific centers and various other supporting scientific organizations.

The Academy reports on the annual basis to the Cabinet of Ministers of Ukraine. The presidium of the academy is located at vulytsia Volodymyrska, 57, across the street from the Building of Pedagogical Museum, which was used to host the Central Council during the independence period of 1917-18.

In 1919–1991 it was a republican branch of the Academy of Sciences of the Soviet Union.

Names
Over its history, the NAS Ukraine has had these 5 names.

History

Establishment of the Academy

The direct institutional predecessors of the Ukrainian Academy of Sciences were the Shevchenko Scientific Society in Lemberg (Lviv) and the Ukrainian Scientific Society in Kyiv that due to various circumstances did not developed into national academy.

The initiative to create such an institution came from the Ukrainian Science Society in April 1917, eight months before the beginning of the Soviet-Ukrainian War. However it was finally materialized during the time of the Ukrainian State, when on the proposal of the Minister of Education and Arts Mykola Vasylenko a special commission was formed. Headed by academician of the Russian Academy of Sciences Volodymyr Vernadskyi, the commission has drafted a bill about creation of the Ukrainian Academy of Science in Kyiv with its National Library, National Museum, and other scientific institutions. At the end of June 1918 the issue on creation of the Academy was raised at the Ukrainian Science Society Extraordinary General Assembly (June 23 and 28). During July 9 - September 17, 1918 the commission based on the proposed by Vernadskyi a model of Ukrainian Academy of Sciences (UAS) as an academy with universal characteristics has developed a bill for the creation of the Academy, a draft of its statute and staff, estimate. Based on them on November 14, 1918 Hetman of Ukraine Pavlo Skoropadsky signed the Law of Ukrainian State about establishing of the Ukrainian Academy of Sciences in Kyiv, and also approved the UAS statute, the UAS staff and its institutions and the order of Ministry of National Education about appointing the first 12 full members (academicians) of the UAS.

According to its original statute, the Academy consisted of three research departments in history and philology (1st department), physics and mathematics (2nd department), as well as social studies (3rd department). Its structural units became permanent commissions and institutes. There were planned 15 institutes, 14 permanent commissions, 6 museums, 2 offices, 2 laboratories, botanical and acclimatization gardens, astronomical observatory, biology station, printing house and national library. All publishing of academy was to be printed in the Ukrainian language. Its statute emphasized the all-Ukrainian nature: the members could be not only citizens of the Ukrainian State, but also the Ukrainian scientists of the West Ukraine (at that time citizens of Austria-Hungary). Foreigners could become academicians as well, but on the resolution of the 2/3 of the active members' composition.

The presidium of newly created academy and its first academicians (three to each department) were appointed by the Ukrainian government, while the future members were expected to be elected by those academicians (as an active members). Among the first academicians were historians Dmytro Bahaliy and Orest Levytsky, economists Mykhailo Tuhan-Baranovsky and Volodymyr Kosynsky, eastern studies Ahathanhel Krymsky and Nikolai Petrov, linguist Stepan Smal-Stotsky, geologists Volodymyr Vernadsky and Pavlo Tutkovsky, biologist Mykola Kashchenko, mechanic Stepan Tymoshenko, law studies Fedir Taranovsky. For the post of the President of the Academy, the Hetman of Ukraine (head of state) Pavlo Skoropadsky invited Mykhailo Hrushevsky who at that time was the president of the Ukrainian Science Society and before the World War I served as the president of the Shevchenko Scientific Society in Lemberg, neighboring Austria-Hungary, but Hrushevsky declined the invitation yet later (sometime after 1923) became a major figure in the Ukrainian Academy of Science (UAS) in Kyiv.

Its official operations the academy started at the end of November 1918 with having several sessions of General Assembly and assemblies of its departments. The first General Assembly (Constituent) that took place on November 27, 1918 academician Volodymyr Vernadsky was elected the President of academy, while the permanent secretary became Ahathanhel Krymsky. The same day, at the sessions of the 2nd and the 3rd departments there were elected as chairmen respectively Mykola Kashchenko and Mykhailo Tuhan-Baranovsky, on 8 December 1918 the chairman of the 1st department was elected Dmytro Bahaliy. All appointments were approved by Hetman Skoropadskyi.

The first institutions of the UAS established in December 1918 were such commissions: 
 for compilation of historic and geographic dictionary of the Ukrainian land (director Dmytro Bahaliy)
 for compilation of historic dictionary of Ukrainian language (director Yevhen Tymchenko)
 for compilation of the Ukrainian living language dictionary (director Ahathanhel Krymsky)
 for publishing landmarks of the modern Ukrainian script (director Serhiy Yefremov)
 (archaeographic commission) for publishing landmarks of language, script and history (director Vasyl Danylevych)
 acclimatization garden (director Mykhailo Kashchenko)
 institute of technical mechanics (director Stepan Tymoshenko)
 institute of geodesy, institute of economic conjuncture and national economy of Ukraine (director Mykhailo Tuhan-Baranovsky)

Next month there were added following commissions:
 institute of demography
 in research of common law (director Orest Levytsky)
 in research of social issues (director Mykhailo Tuhan-Baranovsky)
 in research of national economy (director Volodymyr Kosynsky)

First years
During its first years the academy operated during the period of political instability and economical ruin (Ukrainian–Soviet War, Russian Civil War, Polish–Soviet War). The leadership of the Ukrainian Academy of Sciences sought its recognition by each new power and principally emphasizing on non-political background of the main science center. Despite the financial hardship, famine, arrests, and emigration of some of its members, the UAS has not only survived as an institution, but developed its structure and directions of research, began to prepare for publication its scientific works.

On 3 January 1919 the Direktoria of the Ukrainian People's Republic has adopted legislatively changes to the UAS statute, according to which there were made provisions concerning printing of works in Ukrainian and foreign languages (volume of publications in foreign language should not exceeded the 1/4 amount of the Ukrainian language), all the UAS officials had to freely possess the Ukrainian language, and full members upon their approval would swear in allegiance to the Ukrainian People's Republic. The Supreme power also has left after itself the right to approve the newly elected members at the UAS General Assembly.

Following occupation of Kyiv by Bolshevik forces, on 11 February 1919 to the Ukrainian Academy of Sciences was handed over as its own property the mansion and former boarding house of countess Levashova on the order of People's Commissar of Education of the Ukrainian Socialist Soviet Republic, Volodymyr Zatonskyi. The next day on 12 February 1919 there took place an extraordinary UAS General Assembly, during which Ahatanhel Krymsky passed on the order of Zatonskyi immediately to start the work. Since the late 1920s, in the Soviet historiography that day was considered as the day of establishing the Academy of Sciences contrary to 14 February 1918 when Hetman Skoropadskyi signed the law on creation of the academy.

After several change of powers and withdrawal of the Denikin's forces in December 1919 the Bolsheviks permanently established themselves in Kyiv. With the second arrival of Bolsheviks Vernadsky resigned. Orest Levytskyor was elected President of the Academy for the next couple of years. In 1921 Levytsky was replaced by a newly elected Mykola Vasylenko, however he was not approved by the authorities and soon was replaced with Levytsky. Vasylenko after that was arrested in 1923 and convicted (later released on amnesty).

On June 14, 1921, the Council of People's Commissars of Ukrainian SSR adopted a decree "Resolution on the Ukrainian Academy of Sciences", according to which the Academy was recognized as the highest scientific state institution and subordinated to the Narkom of Education. The Academy was renamed from UAS to VUAN as the All-Ukrainian Academy of Sciences underlining its meaning for the Ukrainian territories under Poland, Romania, Czechoslovakia and declaring its intentions to unite within one organization the scientific intelligentsiya of all Ukrainian lands. The relationship between the members of VUAN and the Soviet authorities soured, while the relationships with the Ukrainian scientists abroad had completely diminished. After the historian Orest Levytsky the President of the Academy became the botanist Volodymyr Lypsky. Between 1919-1930 to the Academy were elected 103 academicians. In 1924-5, the Academy held its first election for foreign members. However, none of the candidates were approved by the Narkom of Education.

In 1929, two of its members (Serhiy Yefremov and Mykhailo Slabchenko) and 24 corresponding agents (such as Osip Hermaize, Hryhoriy Holoskevych, Andriy Nikovsky, and others) were arrested in accusation to belonging to the non-existing (as later it was established) Union for the Freedom of Ukraine. None of the arrested have ever been released.

Chief executive posts

Presidents

Chief scientific secretary

Structure and administration

The National Academy of Sciences of Ukraine according to its official status is a higher scientific self-governed organization of Ukraine and was founded on a state property. The self-government of the Academy is kept in independent determination of its research's thematic and forms of its organization and realization, formation of its organizational structure, solving own issues with administration of research, its financing, and professional cadres, fulfillment of its international scientific relations, free election and collegiality of its governing authority. The Academy brings together full members, corresponding members, and its foreign members, all scientists of its institutions, organizes and conducts fundamental and applied scientific research in the most important issues of natural, technical, social, and humanitarian sciences.

Administration
The highest body of self-government of the National Academy of Sciences of Ukraine is its General Assembly (Zahalni zbory) that consists of full members (academicians) and corresponding members. Except for issues relating to election of full members, corresponding members and foreign members of the Academy, at the General Assembly sessions take part with the right of decisive vote scientists who were delegated by work collective of the Academy's scientific institutions and with the right of advisory vote foreign members, directors of the Academy's scientific institutions, and representatives of scientific community.

In period between the General Assembly sessions the Academy's activities are being administered (supervised) by the National Academy of Sciences of Ukraine Presidium which is elected by General Assembly on the term of 5 years. The NASU Presidium that was lastly elected in April 2015 consists of 32 persons including president, 5 vice-presidents, Chief Scientific Secretary, 14 department secretaries-academicians, 11 other members. In the Presidium's sessions take part with the right of advisory vote 5 acting Presidium members and 14 NASU Presidium advisers. The presidium meets in the former building of Countess Levashova that the Academy owns since its establishment in 1918. The presidium also directs operations of the Academy's publishing institutions as well as some selected science and other institutions among which are own exposition center, Grand Conference Hall, etc.

In the NASU function 3 sections with 14 departments within them. There also are 6 regional science centers in various regions of the country, which have dual subordination also to the Ministry of Education and Science of Ukraine. The basic elements of the NASU's structure are scientific research institutes and other scientific institutions such as observatories, botanic gardens, arboreta, nature preserves, libraries, museums, other. In 2006 the Academy accounted for 43,613 employees including 16,813 researchers; among them, 2,493 with degree of Doktor Nauk (Doctor of Sciences) and 7,996 with degree of Kandidat Nauk (Candidate of Sciences, Ph.D.).

The NASU is responsible for over 90% of all discoveries made in Ukraine, including the transmutation of lithium into helium, the production of heavy water, and the development of a 3-D radar that operates in the decimeter range.

Sections
 Section of Physical-Technical and Mathematical Sciences
 Department of Mathematics
 Department of Computer Science
 Department of Mechanics
 Department of Physics and Astronomy
 Department of Earth Sciences
 Department of Physical and Technical Problems of Materials Science
 Department of Physical and Technical Problems of Power Engineering
 Department of Nuclear Physics and Power Engineering
 Section of Chemical and Biological Sciences
 Department of Chemistry
 Department of Biochemistry, Physiology and Molecular Biology
 Department of General Biology
 Section of Social Sciences and Humanities
 Department of Economics
 Department of History, Philosophy and Law
 Department of Literature, Language and Art Studies

Regional centers
Regional science centers (SCs) are:
 Donetsk SC (center in Donetsk, temporarily relocated to Kramatorsk) - 9 research institutes;
 Western SC (Lviv) - 18 institutes;
 Southern SC (Odessa) - 7 institutes;
 North-East SC (Kharkiv) led by Volodymyr Semynozhenko since 25.11.1992 - 17 institutes;
 Dnieper SC (Dnipro) - 7 institutes;
 Crimea SC (Simferopol) - 8 institutes (statute activities and financing is suspended since 2014).
The most of institutions of the Academy (212) are placed in the city of Kyiv, following by Kharkiv (39) and Lviv (27). The Academy is represented at least by one institution in most of the oblasts in Ukraine, except Volyn, Rivne, Ternopil, Khmelnytsky, Vinnytsia, and Kirovohrad.

Scientific institutions of the NASU

Libraries
There are 2 national libraries affiliated with the NASU:
The V. I. Vernadsky National Library of Ukraine with 10 million books, manuscripts
The V. Stefanyk National Library in Lviv.

Institutes
A. Pidhornyi Institute of Mechanical Engineering Problems in Kharkiv

Parks and nature reserves
The department of General Biology includes a number of parks and nature reserves.
 Trostianets dendro-park
 Donetsk Botanic Garden
 Danube Biosphere Preserve
 Karadah Nature Preserve
 Kryvyi Rih Botanic Garden
 Luhansk Nature Preserve
 M.M. Gryshko National Botanical Garden
 Oleksandriya dendro-park
 Sofiyivka dendro-park
 Ukrainian Steppe Nature Preserve
 Black Sea Biosphere Reserve

Research centers and funds

Publishers
The NASU has two publishing houses:
«Наукова думка» (roughly "Scientific Thought" or "Naukova dumka") and
«Академперіодика» (roughly "Academic Periodical" or "Akademperiodyka")

The NASU has made major contributions to most of the major fields of science.

Former (disbanded) institutions
 Commission in research of the Soviet Law (1927–1934)
 Cabinet of the Soviet Construction and Law (1930–1934)
 Commission in research of the History of Western-Russian and Ukrainian Law (1919–1934)
 Commission about the History of Common Law (1918–1934)
 Demographic Institute (1918–1938)

Awards

Bogolyubov Prize
The Bogolyubov Prize is an award offered by the Academy for scientists with outstanding contribution to theoretical physics and applied mathematics. The award is issued in the memory of theoretical physicist and mathematician Nikolay Bogolyubov.

Vernadsky Gold Medal
The Academy has awarded its Vernadsky Gold Medal annually since 2004 to the most distinguished academicians.

 2003 Borys Paton
 2004 Platon Kostiuk and Szilveszter E. Vizi
 2005 Viktor Skopenko and  Nikolai Plate
 2006 Yurii Mitropolskiy and Yury Osipov
 2007 Myroslav Popovych and Georges Nivat
 2008 Viktor Baryakhtar and Vladimir Kadyshevsky
 2009 Volodymyr Marchenko and Jean Bourgain
 2010 Mikhail Lisitsa and Manuel Cardona
 2011 Borys Oliynyk and Blaže Ristovski
 2012 Mykola Bahrov and Nikolai Laverov
 2013 Oleksandr Huz and Herbert Mang
 2014
 2015 Alexei Abrikosov
 2016 Anthony Turner and Ganna V. Elska
2017
2018
2019
2020
 2021 Anton Zeilinger

See also
 National Herbarium of Ukraine
 Ukrainian Science Society (1907–1921), a predecessor of the National Academy of Sciences of Ukraine
 Ministry of Education and Science of Ukraine
 Members of the National Academy of Sciences of Ukraine

State-funded research institutions
 Institute for Problems of Cryobiology and Cryomedicine
 National Academy of Arts of Ukraine
 National Academy of Medical Sciences of Ukraine
 National Academy of Agrarian Sciences of Ukraine
 National Academy of Legal Sciences of Ukraine
 National Academy of Pedagogical Sciences of Ukraine
 Minor Academy of Sciences of Ukraine

Public-funded research institutions
 Academy of Mining Sciences of Ukraine
 Academy of Economic Sciences of Ukraine
 Academy of Higher Education of Ukraine
 Shevchenko Scientific Society
 Ukrainian Free Academy of Sciences of Canada (Winnipeg)
 Ukrainian Academy of Art and Sciences in the US (New York)

Notes

References

External links
  
 Brief Annual Report of NASU for 2006
 Shpak, A.P., Yurkova, O.V. National Academy of Sciences of Ukraine (НАЦІОНАЛЬНА АКАДЕМІЯ НАУК УКРАЇНИ). Encyclopedia of History of Ukraine. 2010
 National Academy of Sciences of Ukraine. The Statute of the National Academy of Sciences of Ukraine (Статут Національної академії наук України). Verkhovna Rada website. Registered 11 June 2002. 

 
Scientific organizations based in Ukraine
Shevchenkivskyi District, Kyiv
USSR Academy of Sciences
Scientific organizations established in 1918
1918 establishments in Ukraine
Culture in Kyiv
Soviet culture
Institute of History of the Party (Ukraine)
Members of the International Council for Science
Members of the International Science Council
Institutions with the title of National in Ukraine